John Glaser Pottery Factory, also known as the Archibald S. Bryan Building, was a historic pottery factory building located at Washington, Franklin County, Missouri. It was built about 1879, and expanded about 1890.  It was a one-story with basement, heavy timber frame building in the Fachwerk form.  It was set into a hillside and located close to the river and the railroad tracks.  The factory operated until about 1901 and later converted to residential use.

It was listed on the National Register of Historic Places in 2001 and delisted in 2006.

References

Former National Register of Historic Places in Missouri
Industrial buildings and structures on the National Register of Historic Places in Missouri
Industrial buildings completed in 1878
Buildings and structures in Franklin County, Missouri
National Register of Historic Places in Franklin County, Missouri
Ceramics manufacturers of the United States
1878 establishments in Missouri